David McIntosh may refer to:

 David McIntosh (Gladiators) (born 1985), English actor
 David McIntosh (Scottish footballer), Scottish footballer
 Dave McIntosh (1925–1995), Scottish footballer
 David Gregg McIntosh (1836–1916), U.S. Civil War Confederate officer
 David M. McIntosh (born 1958), American politician
 David McIntosh (Venezuelan footballer) (born 1973), Venezuelan football centre back